The grey tit (Melaniparus afer) is a species of bird in the tit family Paridae.
It is found in Lesotho and South Africa.
Its natural habitats are subtropical or tropical dry shrubland and Mediterranean-type shrubby vegetation.

The grey tit was formerly one of the many species in the genus Parus but was moved to Melaniparus after a molecular phylogenetic analysis published in 2013 showed that the members of the new genus formed a distinct clade.

References

External links
 (Southern) grey tit - Species text in The Atlas of Southern African Birds.

grey tit
Birds of Southern Africa
grey tit
grey tit
Taxonomy articles created by Polbot